Thomas Abratis (born 6 May 1967 in Waldheim, Sachsen) is a former East German/German nordic combined skier who competed from 1987 to 1997. He won a bronze medal in the 3 x 10 km team event at the 1989 FIS Nordic World Ski Championships in Lahti.

Abratis earned two individual career victories in Germany in 1993, and, after his retirement from athletics, became a technical delegate for the International Ski Federation.

References

External links 

1967 births
German male Nordic combined skiers
Olympic Nordic combined skiers of Germany
Nordic combined skiers at the 1994 Winter Olympics
Living people
FIS Nordic World Ski Championships medalists in Nordic combined